Philip Kran Paval (20 April 1899 – 1 March 1971) was a Danish painter. His work was part of the painting event in the art competition at the 1932 Summer Olympics.

References

1899 births
1971 deaths
20th-century Danish painters
Danish male painters
Olympic competitors in art competitions
People from Falster
20th-century Danish male artists